Miya Ando (born 1973) is an American visual artist recognized for her paintings, sculptures, and installation artworks that address concepts of temporality, interdependence, and impermanence. Ando's artworks have been exhibited in museums, galleries, and public spaces worldwide.

Central themes and career 

In her conceptually-driven paintings, drawings, and sculptures, Ando often uses imagery evoking ephemeral natural phenomena such as clouds, the seasons, tides, rain, or moonlight, to articulate fundamental realities of existence. The artist has noted, "nature is the great equaliser. We all know what rain is. We all know the feeling of experiencing vastness. I like the idea of making something that is a barometer of our physical environment." She is known for using steel, or sheets of burnished and chemically treated aluminum as substrates for her distinctively experiential paintings of hypothetical horizons. Ando says of her use of materials, “I have a deep appreciation for the dynamic properties of metal and its ability to reflect light. Metal simultaneously conveys strength and permanence and yet in the same instant can appear delicate, fragile, luminous, soft, ethereal. The medium becomes both a contradiction and juxtaposition for expressing notions of evanescence, including ideas such as the transitory and ephemeral nature of all things, quietude and the underlying impermanence of everything.”  

Ando's work has been featured in solo exhibitions at institutions including The Asia Society Texas, Houston, The Noguchi Museum, Long Island City, New York, SCAD Museum of Art (Savannah College of Art and Design), Georgia; The Nassau County Museum of Art, Roslyn, New York; and the American University Museum, Washington DC.  Artworks by Ando have also been featured in group exhibitions at institutions including: the Los Angeles County Museum of Art (LACMA); The Detroit Institute of Arts; Crystal Bridges Museum of American Art, Bentonville, Arkansas; Haus Der Kunst, Munich, Germany; The Bronx Museum of Arts, New York; and the Queens Museum, Corona, New York. Ando's work is included in the collections of LACMA, and the Detroit Institute of Arts, MI, as well as in numerous other public and private collections. In 2014 Ando was invited to lecture at New York's Metropolitan Museum of Art. In 2018 Ando exhibited her glass cloud sculptures in a solo exhibition at the Noguchi Museum in New York City and at the Katzen Arts Center at the American University Museum.

Public art projects, commissions, and installations 
In 2009, Against the Stream Buddhist Meditation Society commissioned Ando's piece, 8-Fold Path,  which consists of a grid of four steel square canvases measuring 4 feet each. The work was featured in a July 2009 article for Shambhala Sun for its "meditative" nature and "spiritual" influence. Also in 2009, Ando created Fiat Lux (Let There Be Light), a grid of 144 individual 5 × 5 inch steel canvasses for the meditation room in Brooklyn's St.John's Bread and Life Chapel. Ando was also commissioned by president Jay Davidson of The Healing Place, Lexington, KY, to produce an installation for its non-denominational chapel. Ando's forty-foot, phosphorescent-coated steel piece, Shelter[Meditation 1-12], collects sunlight during the day and radiates blue at night.

Ando has also completed public commissions for Montefiore Hospital, Bronx, New York, Bang and Olufsen, the Thanatopolis Exhibition, San Francisco General Hospital, and CalFire. In 2011, Ando worked on commissions for the Haein Art Project in Korea and the Fist Art Foundation in Puerto Rico. Ando has been a participant in the US State Department Art in Embassies Program, and created a memorial for the Tohoku Earthquake and Tsunami for the Nippon Club of New York City.

In 2019, Ando created Ginga (Silver River), a textile banner which meandered through the landscape of the Socrates Sculpture park in Queens, New York.

Since 9/11 
Commissioned by the 9-11 London Project Foundation as a permanent addition to Queen Elizabeth Olympic Park, in front of Zaha Hadid's Aquatic Center in London, England, Ando's sculpture stands eight meters tall and is made from steel recovered from the World Trade Center buildings. Ando's memorial sculpture Since 9/11 (2011) honors the victims of the 2001 attack on the World Trade Center Twin Towers in New York City.

Awards and collaborations

Ando has been the recipient of numerous grants and awards, including the Pollock-Krasner Foundation Grant Award and Commission for The Philip Johnson Glass House, New Canaan, CT.  In 2015, Ando's sculpture Shou Sugi Ban, was featured in Frontiers Reimagined, a group exhibition at the Palazzo Grimani di Santa Maria Formosa Museum during the 56th Venice Biennale.

Personal life 
Ando spent part of her childhood in a Buddhist temple in Japan as well as on 25 acres of the Santa Cruz Mountains' redwood forest in rural coastal Northern California. After graduating magna cum laude from University of California, Berkeley with a degree in East Asian studies, Ando attended Yale University to study Buddhist iconography and imagery before apprenticing with a master metalsmith in Japan. 

Ando is a 16th-generation descendant of Bizen sword maker Ando Yoshiro Masakatsu.

Miya Ando lives in Manhattan, New York, and has her studio in Long Island City.

References

External links
 
 Artsy.net Editorial by Mitch Sawyer, July 22, 2017, "From Kusama to Turrell, 9 Artists Who Made Perfect Spaces for Meditation"
 Brooklyn Sculptor Shares Her Inspiration for London 9/11 Memorial
 Artist Helps Forge Mission of Brooklyn Soup Kitchen
 Huffington Post "Surface & Depth... An Interview With Miya Ando - Artist"

Living people
American contemporary artists
American people of Russian descent
American women sculptors
UC Berkeley College of Letters and Science alumni
American artists of Japanese descent
Yale University alumni
21st-century American women artists
People from Manhattan
Buddhist artists
1973 births